Count of Olocau is a title of the Spanish nobility. Olocau is located in the Spanish province of Valencia.

List of Counts of Olocau
 xxxx - xxxx: Joaquin de Puigdórfila y Zaforteza, 9th Count of Olocau (b. xxxx - d.27 January 1987),
 xxxx - 2011: Felipe de Puigdórfila y Villalonga, 10th Count of Olocau (b.xxxx - d. 2011)
 2011–present: Joaquín de Puigdórfila y Esteve, 11th Count of Olocau

The heiress presumptive is the present holder's eldest daughter, Verónica de Puigdórfila e Itúrregui who is currently living in New York City.

The current Count is the cousin of Rosario, Princess of Preslav.

References

Further reading
 Una Casa Viva: La Casa de la Señoría, La Sierra Calderona, 21 August 2004
 La declinación de la monarquía hispánica en el siglo XVII, Vol. 1, Issue 38. Editor: Francisco José Aranda Pérez. Published by the University of Castilla La Mancha, 2004, 

Counts of Spain
Lists of counts
Lists of Spanish nobility